Satamkar (also Satamker) is a Bene Israel family who lived for centuries in Kolaba (now Raigad District) in the Konkan region, India. Most members moved to Israel from the 1960s through the 1980s; some have settled elsewhere in the world.

Origins 
The Satamkar family has its origins in the village of Satamba/Virjoli, Roha taluka, Raigad district, Maharashtra, near the West Coast of India south of Mumbai. This family belongs to the Bene Israel community, one of the three groups of Indian Jews. According to tradition, ancestors of the Bene Israel were Jews who came to India about 2000 years ago, settled and married into the indigenous population. They are believed to have converted their wives or at least maintained some Jewish traditions in their families.

Life in Kolaba 
The Bene Israel have been living in the Kolaba (today: Raigad) District for close to eighteen centuries. The Satamkar ancestors used to dwell in villages from which they were believed to have taken their surnames (Satamkar = from Satamba (Virjoli), Penker = from the town called Pen, Ashtamkar = from the town called Ashtami, etc. ...). Satamba means, in Marathi, 'Seven Mangoes'. For centuries their principal occupation was oil pressing. They extracted oil from a kind of sesame seed called til and were known as Shaniwar Telli ("Saturday oil pressers"), because they did not work on Saturday.

Settling throughout India 
At the end of the 18th century and, especially during the 19th century, the men enlisted in the Army. With a tradition of literacy, they also found positions in the British colonial government, in the civil service, the railways, the Post office, Customs and Excise. From that time, they settled in all parts of India (present India and Pakistan). Many lived in Mumbai working as carpenters or contractors ('maistry').

At the beginning of the 19th century, some left their village for Mumbai, Nandgaon, Maharashtra and other places. Most members of the Satamkar family lived in Satamba/Virjoli until the 1970s.

Emigration from India 
Between the 1960s and the 1980s, most of the Satamkar family emigrated to Israel; many Bene Israel had already left in the 1950s. Some of them now live in the United Kingdom, the U.S.A., Canada, France, Italy, Spain, Brazil and other western countries. Some of the family still resides in India.

People with the surname Satamkar 
Daniel Abraham Satamkar (known as Daniel Abraham) – Founder of "D. Abraham & Sons" Shipping Company in Mumbai ; trustee and former president of the Thane Synagogue.
David Ezekiel Satamkar – President and Treasurer of the Ghosale & Virjoli/Satamba Bene Israel Community; he was also Representative of the Jewish Central Board in Bombay
Hanoch Satamkar – Film actor and assistant director to Mehboob Khan, prominent director of Hindi films.
Soloman Satamkar- Carpenter
Nathan Soloman Satamkar – Musician.
David Soloman Satamkar – Musician.
Abigail David Satamkar - Music teacher
Benjamin Nathan Satamkar – Musician.
Shegulla Nathan Satamkar (Shegulla Elijah Kasukar)- Indian classical dancer
Rephael David Satamkar - Musician in the Hindi film industry and percussionist
Reena Nathan Satamkar (Reena Elijah Dighorkar)- Indian Classical Dancer
Hananiel Nathan Satamkar – Musician in the Hindi film industry and guitarist.
David Soloman Satamkar – Musician.
Suzan David Satamkar (Sonali Sunil Pendse)- Sitarist and Indian classical dancer
Daniel Rephael Satamkar - Musician and pianist

Gallery

References 

 Shirley Berry Isenberg, India's Bene Israel, a Comprehensive Inquiry and Sourcebook, Popular Prakashan, Bombay, 1988
 Yoel Moses Reuben (Satamkar), The Jews of Pakistan, a Forgotten Heritage, Mumbai: The Bene Israel Heritage Museum and Genealogical Center, 2010
 Bene Israel, Ms 654/1, Central Archives for the History of the Jewish People, Jerusalem,

External links 
The Satamker Family Website
Stamker, Facebook, משפחת סטמקר המורחבת

Bene Israel
Indian surnames
Jews and Judaism in India
People from Raigad district
Jewish families